Kimbe Bay is a large bay in West New Britain Province, off the northern coast of New Britain, Papua New Guinea, at . Kimbe Bay is an important biodiversity hotspot. 60 percent of the coral species of the entire Indo-Pacific region live here. Kimbe Bay is the home of more than 860 coral reef fish species. Because of a massive die-off of coral worldwide due to pollution, human activities, and global warming, Kimbe Bay has become increasingly important, since it is seen as one of the last holdouts for coral should the degradation continue. Efforts are currently underway to limit the human impact on the bay. Due to its beauty it is also a popular diving site.

References

External links 

 Diving in Kimbe Bay

Bays of Papua New Guinea
West New Britain Province